This is a list of Asian American writers, authors, and poets who have Wikipedia pages. Their works are considered part of Asian American literature.

A-D

 Ai
 Shaila Abdullah
 Aria Aber
 George Abraham
 Jessica Abughattas
 Dilruba Ahmed, poet
 Maya Ajmera
 Meena Alexander
 Agha Shahid Ali
 Kazim Ali
 Noel Alumit
 Mia Alvar
 Hala Alyan
 Ryka Aoki
 Fatimah Asghar
 Aziz Ansari
 Gina Apostol
 Gaiutra Bahadur
 Shauna Singh Baldwin
 Peter Bacho, American Book Award winner for the novel Cebu
 Ravi Batra
 Cathy Bao Bean (包圭漪) 
 Susham Bedi
 Bette Bao Lord (包柏漪)
 Rick Barot
 Mei-mei Berssenbrugge (白萱华), poet 
 Cecilia Manguerra Brainard
 Sujata Bhatt
 Jaswinder Bolina
 Jenny Boully
 Carlos Bulosan
 Regie Cabico
 Lan Cao
 Celso Al Carunungan
 Linda Ty Casper
 Gilbert Luis R. Centina III
 Steph Cha
 Theresa Hak Kyung Cha
 Jeffery Paul Chan (陈耀光)
 Rajiv Chandrasekaran
 Jay Chandrasekhar, screenwriter
 Diana Chang (張粲芳), novelist
 Eileen Chang (张爱玲)
 Iris Chang (張純如)
 Jennifer Chang
 K-Ming Chang
 Lan Samantha Chang
 Leonard Chang
 Tina Chang
 Lisa Changadveja
 Bonnie Chau
 Maneet Chauhan
 Daniyal Mueenuddin, author
 Cathy Linh Che
 Alexander Chee
 Anelise Chen
 Justina Chen
 Su Hua Ling Chen (凌叔华)
 Nien Cheng (郑念)
 Anna Chennault (陈香梅)
 King-Kok Cheung
 Cheng Sait Chia
 Fay Chiang
 Monlin Chiang (蒋梦麟)
 Ted Chiang, Hugo and Nebula Award winner 
 Frank Chin (趙健秀)
 Justin Chin
 Marilyn Chin (陈美玲)
 Mei Chin
 Staceyann Chin
 Frank Ching
 Kah Kyung Cho, philosopher
 Khendum Choden
 Don Mee Choi
 Susan Choi
 Roshani Chokshi
 Deepak Chopra
 Louis Chu (雷霆超), author of Eat a Bowl of Tea (1961)
 Wesley Chu (朱恆昱), science fiction writer
 Frances Chung
 Philip W. Chung, playwright
 Peter Ho Davies
 Ghalib Shiraz Dhalla
 Chitra Banerjee Divakaruni
 Dinesh D'Souza, conservative journalist
 Tony D'Souza
 Bei Dao
 Oliver de la Paz
 Margaret Dilloway, author of How To Be An American Housewife (2010)
 Chitra Banerjee Divakaruni
 Do Nguyen Mai, poet

E-J

 Fan Wu (吴帆) 
 Nancy Yi Fan (范禕)
 Sui Sin Far (水仙花), a.k.a. Edith Maude Eaton
 Ben Fee (张恨棠/木云)
 Jamie Ford
 Eugie Foster, Nebula Award winner
 Sesshu Foster
 Francis Fukuyama
 M. Evelina Galang
 Sarah Gambito
 V.V. Ganeshananthan
 Anu Garg
 Atul Gawande
 Tess Gerritsen
 Alex Gilvarry
 Anchee Min
 Zulfikar Ghose
 Khalil Gibran
 Eugene Gloria
 Prince Gomolvilas
 Philip Kan Gotanda
 Vince Gotera
 Amitav Ghosh
 Kovid Gupta
 Ganggang Hu Guidice（胡剛剛）
 Han Suyin (韩素音）
 Jessica Hagedorn
 Kimiko Hahn
 Sarah Haider
 Usha Haley
 Mohsin Hamid
 Jenny Han
 Asma Gull Hasan
 Alamgir Hashmi
 S. I. Hayakawa
 Le Ly Hayslip
 Joseph Heco
 Tess Uriza Holthe
 Cathy Park Hong
 Euny Hong, author
 Garrett Hongo
 Bill Hosokawa
 Khaled Hosseini
 Jeanne Wakatsuki Houston
 TC Huo
 Eddie Huang
 David Henry Hwang (黃哲倫), playwright
 Lawson Fusao Inada
 Daniel K. Inouye
 Pico Iyer
 Tania James
 Gish Jen
 Ha Jin (哈金)

K-L

 Cynthia Kadohata
 Michiko Kakutani
 Mindy Kaling
 Jay Caspian Kang, journalist, novelist
 Michael Kang
 Minsoo Kang, historian and writer
 Younghill Kang, novelist
 Bhanu Kapil
 Sheba Karim
 Hiroshi Kashiwagi, poet, playwright, novelist
 Soji Kashiwagi, playwright
 Siddharth Katragadda
 Nora Okja Keller, author of Comfort Woman (1997) and Fox Girl (2002)
 Porochista Khakpour
 Uzma Aslam Khan
 Parag Khanna
 Crystal Hana Kim
 Elaine H. Kim, author of Asian American Literature: An Introduction to the Writings and Their Social Context
 Jaegwon Kim, philosopher
 Myung Mi Kim
 Patti Kim
 Richard E. Kim, novelist
 Suki Kim, novelist
 Ronyoung Kim
 Maxine Hong Kingston, novelist
 Katie Kitamura
 Bharti Kirchner
 Alexandra Kleeman
 Lisa Ko
 Dorinne K. Kondo
Gowri Koneswaran
 R.F. Kuang
 Helena Kuo
 Kevin Kwan, author
 Jean Kwok, author of Girl in Translation (2010)
 Dan Kwong
 Jhumpa Lahiri
 Him Mark Lai
 Andrew Lam
 Le Thi Diem Thuy
 Ang Lee
 Chang-Rae Lee
 Chin Yang Lee (黎錦揚)
 Don Lee 
 Ed Bok Lee
 Gus Lee (李健孫)
 Helie Lee
 Karen An-hwei Lee
 Krys Lee
 Li-Young Lee
 Stacey Lee
 Joseph O. Legaspi
 Russell Leong
 Yiyun Li
 Sandra Lim
 Shirley Geok-lin Lim
 Adet and Anor Lin
 Ed Lin
 Grace Lin
 Tan Lin
 Tao Lin
 Lin Tai-yi
 R. Zamora Linmark
 Linh Dinh
 Eric Liu
 Ken Liu (刘宇昆), Hugo and Nebula Award winner
 Marjorie Liu
 Timothy Liu
 Malinda Lo
 Teresa Lo, novelist and screenwriter
 Vyvyane Loh
 Mimi Lok
 Bette Bao Lord
 Marie Lu
 David Wong Louie

M-S

 Ling Ma
 Adeline Yen Mah (馬嚴君玲)
 Sezan Mahmud
 Michelle Malkin, conservative newspaper columnist
 Sally Wen Mao
 Maliha Masood
 Sujata Massey
 Kristina McMorris
 Mong-Lan
 Tulika Mehrotra
 Hasan Minhaj
 Mary Anne Mohanraj
 Toshio Mori
 Mai Neng Moua
 Bharati Mukherjee
 Bharati Mukerjee
 David Mura
 Milton Murayama
 Sabina Murray
 An Na, novelist
 Ken Narasaki, playwright
 Sunil Nayar, television writer
 Aimee Nezhukumatathil
 Celeste Ng
 Fae Myenne Ng
 Bich Minh Nguyen, novelist
 Kien Nguyen
 Qui Nguyen
 Nguyen Qui Duc
 Viet Thanh Nguyen
 Thuc Doan Nguyen
 Yone Noguchi
 Sigrid Nunez
 John Okada
 Gary Okihiro
 Daniel Okimoto
 Miné Okubo
 Matthew Olzmann
 Ruth Ozeki
 Pai Hsien-yung, Chinese Muslim writer
 Gary Pak, author of Children of a Fireland: A Novel (2004) and Language of the Geckos and Other Stories (2005)
 Ty Pak, author of Guilt Payment (1983) and Moonbay: Short Stories (1999)
 Linda Sue Park, novelist
 Therese Park
 Yongsoo Park, author of Boy Genius (2002), Las Cucarachas (2004), The Art of Eating Bitter: A Hausfrau Dad's Journey With Kids (2018), and Rated R Boy: Growing Up Korean in 1980s Queens (2020)
 Kamran Pasha
 Craig Santos Perez
 Andrew X. Pham
 Aimee Phan
 Bao Phi
 Michelle Naka Pierce
 Jon Pineda
 Ramesh Ponnuru
 Imad Rahman
 Janaki Ram
 Aneesh Raman
 A.K. Ramanujan
 Anantanand Rambachan, religious writer
 Bino Realuyo
 Rishi Reddi
 Srikanth Reddy
 Paisley Rekdal
 Nina Revoyr
 Barbara Jane Reyes
 Bruce Reyes-Chow
 Margaret Rhee
 Lee Ann Roripaugh
 Patrick Rosal
 Shawna Yang Ryan
 Edward Said
 Albert Saijo
 Yumi Sakugawa
 Bienvenido Santos
 Rahadyan Sastrowardoyo
 Allen Say
 Lisa See, novelist
 Vijay Seshadri
 Vikram Seth
 Simran Sethi, journalist and author of Bread, Wine, Chocolate: The Slow Loss of Foods We Love (2015)
 T. K. Seung, philosopher
 Purvi Shah, poet
 Naren Shankar, screenwriter 
 Prageeta Sharma
 Brenda Shaughnessy
 Sun Yung Shin, poet
 Bapsi Sidhwa
 SJ Sindu, novelist
 Monica Sone, autobiographer
 Cathy Song
 Etsu Inagaki Sugimoto
 Indu Sundaresan, historical fiction author
 Sui Sin Far
 Sokunthary Svay
 Arthur Sze
 Mai-Mai Sze

T-Z

 Eileen Tabios
 Ronald Takaki, UC Berkeley history professor
 Grace Talusan
 Amy Tan, novelist
 Lucy Tan, novelist
 Ronald Tanaka
 Lysley Tenorio
 Timothy Tau
 Madeleine Thien
 Bhagat Singh Thind, author
 Sherry Thomas, novelist
 Tim Toyama, playwright
 Barbara Tran
 Truong Tran
 Vu Tran
 Monique Truong
 Hsi Tseng Tsiang (a.k.a. H.T. Tsiang)
 Gail Tsukiyama
 Yoshiko Uchida
 Thrity Umrigar
 Loung Ung
 Abraham Verghese
 Jose Garcia Villa
 Padma Viswanathan
 Saymoukda Vongsay
 Ocean Vuong
Gemini Wahhaj
 Raees Warsi
 Onoto Watanna, a.k.a. Winnifred Eaton
 Qian Julie Wang
 Weike Wang
 Yun Wang
 Michi Weglyn
 Jade Snow Wong
 Jane Wong
 Nellie Wong
 Raymond K. Wong
 Shawn Wong
 Merle Woo
 Sung J. Woo
 Bryan Thao Worra
 Fan Wu (吴帆)
 William F. Wu
 Mitsuye Yamada
 Hisaye Yamamoto
 Lois-Ann Yamanaka
 Karen Tei Yamashita
 Wakako Yamauchi
 Gene Luen Yang (楊謹倫)
 Jeff Yang
 Kao Kalia Yang
 Yanyi
 John Yau
 Lisa Yee
 Paul Yoon
 Monica Youn
 C. Dale Young
 Charles Yu, novelist
 Lizzie Yu Der Ling
 Laurence Yep
 Connie Young Yu, writer and historian
 Judy Yung
 Fareed Zakaria, political analyst author
 C. Pam Zhang
 Jenny Zhang
 Jenny Tinghui Zhang
 Kat Zhang
 Helen Zia (謝漢蘭)

See also 

Asian American Literary Awards
Asian American literature
Asian/Pacific American Awards for Literature
Before Columbus Foundation
Chinese American literature
List of American writers of Korean descent
List of Asian Canadian writers
Multi-Ethnic Literature of the United States

External links
Interviews with young Asian American writers
Korean American Literature

References

 
Asian American writers
Writers Asian-American